The MCKK Premier 7's 2013 was the third edition of the annual, invitational Malay College Rugby Premier Sevens, which involved teams from Malaysia premier schools, states champions and international schools.  Brunei International School and Hong Kong Sports School joined in the fray as international participant, other than Vajiravudh College of Thailand.Singapore withdrew their participation this year and is replaced by Maktab Rendah Sains Mara Kuala Terengganu It was held from 22 till 24 February 2013. The defending champions, Sekolah Sukan Tengku Mahkota Ismail were shocked by their first defeat in the tournament after two undefeated editions which led to its failure of retaining the NJ Ryan Cup. However, it wrapped up this edition as Bowl champion. After two editions, the host, Malay College Kuala Kangsar, finally were crowned as the new champions, defeating Sekolah Menengah Sains Hulu Selangor in Cup final with score 19-7.

Competition format
The tournament were played as 7-a-side match in accordance with variation of International Rugby Board (IRB) Sevens rules. Due to popular requests by the participating teams, the tournament format of eight groups to three have changed to six groups of four. This resulted in each team playing an additional game during the Preliminary Rounds which entailed the Tournament to be held over three days with six preliminary matches being played on the first day with the remainder played on the second day. Six games will played on Friday starting at 4 pm followed by 30 games on Saturday, starting from 8 am for the preliminary rounds. The teams will then be ranked and grouped into four categories - Championship, Plate, Bowl and Shield. A total of 24 matches for the knockout stages will be played on the final day of the tournament. For each match duration for all the matches will be seven minutes for each half of two with a one-minute break in between. For the finals, 10 minutes will be given for each half as well as an additional one-minute between the interval.

Group stage

The group stage concluded with much surprise. The most surprising being the poor showing by two seeded teams, namely two-time defending Champions, Sekolah Sukan Tunku Mahkota Ismail of Johor, and Cup Semifinalist  of Sarawak, which resulted in both schools missing out on the Cup Quarter Finals.

At the end of the group stage,  topped Group A leaving tournament favourites languishing in third place behind newcomers of La Salle Secondary School of Sabah. Group B’s seeded team, also placed third in its Group which was headed by Sekolah Menengah Sains Sultan Mahmud. Another seeded team which failed to top its group and missed the Cup Quarter Finals was Sekolah Tuanku Abdul Rahman, Ipoh, Perak when it lost to international newcomer, Hong Kong Sports School in a pulsating and absorbing final game of Group E. The three other seeded teams, i.e. hosts Malay College Kuala Kangsar, East Coast powerhouse, and State champion, Sekolah Menengah Sains Hulu Selangor, justified their seeding by winning their respective groups in convincing fashion.

Joining the six group winners are the two best second placed teams – Kolej Yayasan Saad of Melaka and Negeri Sembilan’s Sekolah Dato' Abdul Razak from Groups B and F respectively.

Group A

Group B

Group C

Group D

Group E

Group F

Finals

Shield

Bowl
The Bowl final were played with extra time and sudden death.

Cup/Plate Quarter Finals
The winner of the quarter finals gain entrance to Cup semi-finals. The defeated at this quarter final gain entrance to Plate semi-finals.

Plate

Cup

Sponsors
Premier Sponsor - Telekom Malaysia
Major Sponsors - UEM Group, Scomi, MTU Services, Ernst and Young,  Sissons Paints, Genting Plantations, Agro Bank Malaysia, Land Rover, Karangkraf
Official Car - Land Rover
Official Medical Service Provider - KPJ Healthcare
Official Logistics - SA Kargo
Official Printer - Karangkraf
Official Communication Service Provider - Supreme Landmobile & Wireless

The tournament also receives the support from the Ministry of Education (Malaysia), The State Government of Perak, Majlis Perbandaran Kuala Kangsar, Jabatan Kerja Raya and all local authorities in the Kuala Kangsar district.

See also 

 Rugby League World Cup
 Women's Rugby World Cup
 Rugby World Cup Overall Record

References

2013
2013 rugby sevens competitions
2013 in Asian rugby union
rugby union